Caravaggio is a 2007 Italian television miniseries directed by Angelo Longoni. The film is based on real life events of Baroque painter Michelangelo Merisi da Caravaggio.

Cast 

 Alessio Boni as Caravaggio
 Elena Sofia Ricci as  Costanza Colonna
 Jordi Mollà as  Francesco Maria del Monte
 Claire Keim as  Fillide Melandroni
 Paolo Briguglia as  Mario Minniti
 Benjamin Sadler as  Onorio Longhi
 Sarah Felberbaum as  Lena
 Maurizio Donadoni as  Ranuccio Tomassoni
 Maria Elena Vandone as  Beatrice Cenci 
 Luigi Diberti as  Scipione Borghese
 Ruben Rigillo as  Fabrizio Colonna  
 Joachim Bißmeier as  Cardinal Gonzaga

References

External links

Caravaggio
2000s Italian television miniseries
Cultural depictions of Italian men
Cultural depictions of 17th-century painters